Dmytro Prosvirnin (born 7 January 1967) is a Ukrainian skier. He competed in the Nordic combined event at the 1994 Winter Olympics.

References

External links
 

1967 births
Living people
Ukrainian male Nordic combined skiers
Olympic Nordic combined skiers of Ukraine
Nordic combined skiers at the 1994 Winter Olympics
People from Vorokhta
Sportspeople from Ivano-Frankivsk Oblast